Chandrapur district (Marathi pronunciation: [t͡ʃən̪d̪ɾəpuːɾ]) (earlier known as Chanda district) is a district in the Nagpur Division in the Indian state of Maharashtra. Chandrapur was the largest district in India until the Gadchiroli and Sironcha tehsils were separated as Gadchiroli district in 1981. In 2011, the district population was 2,204,307.

Chandrapur district is known for its super thermal power station, and its vast reserves of coal in Wardha Valley Coalfield. Chandrapur also has large reservoirs of limestone which is a raw material for cement manufacturing in the district.

Chandrapur district is known for its cleanliness. Now Chandrapur city is in the top 10 cleanest cities India and 2 in Maharashtra after Navi Mumbai by The minister of housing and urban affairs rank cities based on the cleanliness index.

Tadoba Andhari Tiger Reserve in the district is one of India's twenty-eight Project Tiger reserves. The 2015 census of tigers found that 120 of Maharashtra's 170 tigers were located in Chandrapur district. The district has the highest tiger population in Maharashtra which leads to several man animal conflicts.

Representative

Office 

Suresh Narayan Dhanorkar (INC) 

Ashok Nete (BJP)

Guardian Minister

list of Guardian Minister

District Magistrate/Collector

list of District Magistrate / Collector

Divisions

Chandrapur district comprises 23 census towns and 1792 villages spread over 15 talukas.

Politics
The district contains six Vidhan Sabha (legislative assembly) constituencies. They are Rajura, Chandrapur, Ballarpur, Warora, Bramhapuri and Chimur. Rajura, Chandrapur, Ballarpur, and Warora are part of the Chandrapur Lok Sabha constituency. Bramhapuri and Chimur are part of the Gadchiroli-Chimur Lok Sabha constituency.

Demography

At the time of the 2011 census of India, Chandrapur district had a population of 2,204,307, which was 1.96 percent of the population of the Maharashtra state. Between 2001 and 2011, the district population grew by 6.43 percent. Females numbered 1,080,473 and males 1,123,834. For every 1,000 males, there were 961 females. 80.01 percent of people in Chandrapur district were literate. 35.18% of the population lived in urban areas. Scheduled Castes and Scheduled Tribes made up 15.80% and 17.66% of the population respectively.

At the time of the 2011 Census of India, 83.63% of the population in the district spoke Marathi, 7.00% Hindi, 2.58% Telugu, 1.59% Gondi and 0.98% Urdu as their first language.

Marathi is the major language spoken in the district. Gondi is spoken by a significant number of tribal people.

Geography
The Chandrapur district is located in the far east of Maharashtra state. It is part of Nagpur division. The district is in the eastern part of the Vidarbha region. The Chandrapur district is located between 19.30’ N and 20.45’ N latitude and at 78.46’ E longitude. The district is surrounded by Bhandara and Nagpur districts at its northern side, Wardha and Yavatmal districts at its western side, Gadchiroli district on the eastern side and Komaram Bheem and Adilabad districts of Telangana state on the southern side. In the Survey of India degree sheet, it falls in NOS 55 LF and 56 I M.

Economy
The Chandrapur district has large deposits of coal. The district also has limestone mines for the manufacturing of cement. The Chandrapur Super Thermal Power Station managed by the Maharashtra State Power Generation Company Limited is a thermal power plant. The Chandrapur Ferro Alloy Plant, a public sector unit engaged in the production of manganese based ferro-alloys.

In 1956, the Ballarpur Industries Limited paper mill was founded in the district. Raw materials such as bamboo, wood, sabai grass, soya bean and cottonseed oil, rags and yarn waste are sourced locally.

See also

 List of talukas in Chandrapur district
 Tadoba Andhari Tiger Reserve
 Irai Dam
 Chandrapur Super Thermal Power Station
 Chandrapur Ferro Alloy Plant
 Ballarpur Industries Limited

References

External links

 Official Website of Chandrapur District
 Chandrapur Land Information
 Chandrapur District Complaint Center

 
1981 establishments in Maharashtra
Coal mining districts in India
Districts of Maharashtra
Nagpur division
Vidarbha